The 2022 Women's T20 Challenge, also known as the My 11 Circle Women's T20 Challenge for sponsorship reasons, was the fourth season of the Women's T20 Challenge, a Twenty20 tournament established by the Board of Control for Cricket in India (BCCI) in 2018. Similar to the previous edition, it was a three-team tournament consisting of a group stage of three matches, followed by a final. In the final, IPL Supernovas beat IPL Velocity by 4 runs to win their 3rd title.

Venue
The tournament was held from 23 May to 28 May, with all the matches played at Maharashtra Cricket Association Stadium, Pune.

Squads
The squads were announced on 16 May 2022.

Points table

 Advanced to final

Round-robin

Final

See also 

 India women's national cricket team

References

External links
Series home at ESPNcricinfo

Women's T20 Challenge
Women's Twenty20 cricket competitions